Wakefield Girls' High School (WGHS) is an independent school in Wakefield, England, established in 1878 in Wentworth House. The initial enrolment of 59 pupils has since increased to 665.

Community
The school is part of the Wakefield Grammar School Foundation, comprising Wakefield Girls' High School Queen Elizabeth Grammar School and Wakefield Grammar Pre-Preparatory School.

Education
In 2021, 29% of students earnt A* grades at A Level. 63% of students achieved straight A* and A grades awarded in three or more subjects and 85% of students achieved grades A* to B.

Also in 2021, over 75% of all GCSE entries were awarded 9 – 7 grades with one-third being awarded grade 9.

Notable alumnae

 Dame Barbara Hepworth, artist
 Dame Anne Mueller, British civil servant and academic. Second Permanent Secretary at the Cabinet Office from 1984 to 1987 and then at HM Treasury from 1987 to 1990. She was Chancellor of De Montfort University from 1991 until 1995.
 Monica Edwards, children's author
 Helen Fielding, author of Bridget Jones's Diary
 Joanne Harris, author of Chocolat
 Katherine Kelly, actress
 Usha Prashar, member of the House of Lords
 Dame Elsie Marjorie Williamson DBE, British academic, educator, physicist and Principal of Royal Holloway College, University of London
 Nichi Hodgson, British journalist, broadcaster, and author.
 Heidi Allen, British former politician, served as Member of Parliament South Cambridgeshire 2015 – 2019, February 2019 resigned, leader of Change UK, University of London

Coat of arms

References

External links

 Wakefield Grammar School Foundation website

Girls' schools in West Yorkshire
Private schools in the City of Wakefield
Educational institutions established in 1878
1878 establishments in England
Schools in Wakefield